II is the second and final studio album by the American music duo Capital Kings. Gotee Records released the album digitally on October 2, 2015, while the compact disc was released on October 16, 2015.

Critical reception

Awarding the album four stars at CCM Magazine, Matt Conner states, "The scope is a bit narrower than before, but Capital Kings truly make their mark on their second album". Roger Gelwicks, giving the album four stars from Jesus Freak Hideout, says, "Preceded by a serviceable debut, II proves that the duo are here for the long haul and have plenty of muscles to flex".

Sarah Fine, indicating in a four star review by New Release Today, replies, "This is an overall successful album and one of the strongest in the EDM vein I've heard all year." Rating the album a 4.9 out of five for The Christian Beat, Chris Major writes, "it has far exceeded all expectations". Joshua Andre, signaling in a four star review at 365 Days of Inspiring Media, responds, "this new album II is head and shoulders above anything they’ve ever recorded!"

Track listing

Charts

Weekly charts

Year-end charts

References 

2015 albums
Gotee Records albums
Capital Kings albums